Seonyudo is a railway station on Line 9 of the Seoul Subway.

Station layout

Seoul Metropolitan Subway stations
Metro stations in Yeongdeungpo District
Railway stations opened in 2009